Desmond Clarke (1942–2016) was an Irish author and professor of philosophy.

Des or Desmond Clarke may also refer to:

 Desmond Clarke (writer) (1907–1979), Irish writer and librarian
 Des Clarke (comedian) (born 1981), Scottish stand-up comedian, television and radio presenter
 Des Clarke (Neighbours), a fictional character in the Australian soap opera Neighbours

See also
Desmond Clark (disambiguation)